Westminster Magistrates' Court is a magistrates' court at 181 Marylebone Road, London. The Chief Magistrate of England and Wales, who is the Senior District Judge of England and Wales, sits at the court, and all extradition and terrorism-related cases pass through it. The court opened on 22 September 2011 as a replacement for the City of Westminster Magistrates' Court.

Notable case
In February 2014 the court heard a case in which a former member of the Church of Jesus Christ of Latter-day Saints (LDS Church) launched a rare private prosecution bid with the court, which issued a summons to Thomas S. Monson (the then leader of the LDS Church) to answer claims under the 2006 Fraud Act. A church spokesperson characterised the allegations as bizarre, later stating that Monson has no intention of appearing in person at the 14 March hearing. Experts consulted by the press found it highly unlikely that Monson would be extradited from the United States. A former crown prosecutor stated: "I think the British courts will recoil in horror. This is just using the law to make a show, an anti-Mormon point. And I'm frankly shocked that a magistrate has issued it." The person lodging the complaint is the managing editor of "a website highly critical of the church." 

John Dehlin stated he believed publicity to be the plaintiff's goal, and that it worked, based on the 800,000 page views to the plaintiff's website on 4 February, a record for that site. Monson did not appear at the 14 March hearing, but instead was represented by legal counsel, who contested the summons. On 20 March 2014, Judge Howard Riddle, chief magistrate in Westminster Magistrates' Court, ruled that the case was "an abuse of the process of the court" and that "the court is being manipulated to provide a high-profile forum to attack the religious beliefs of others".

References

Court buildings in London
Buildings and structures in the City of Westminster
Magistrates' courts in England and Wales